The Battle of Majuba Hill on 27 February 1881 was the final and decisive battle of the First Boer War that was a resounding victory for the Boers. The British Major General Sir George Pomeroy Colley occupied the summit of the hill on the night of 26–27 February 1881. Colley's motive for occupying Majuba Hill, near Volksrust, now in South Africa, may have been anxiety that the Boers would soon occupy it themselves, since he had witnessed their trenches being dug in the direction of the hill.

The Boers believed that he might have been attempting to outflank their positions at Laing's Nek. The hill was not considered to be scalable by the Boers for military purposes and so it may have been Colley's attempt to emphasise British power and strike fear into the Boer camp.

The battle is considered by some to have been one of the "most humiliating" defeats suffered by the British in their military history.

Battle
Each man carried 70 rounds of ammunition, a full water bottle, 3 day's rations, a waterproof sheet, and a greatcoat. 2 companies of the 60th Rifles (King's Royal Rifle Corps) who had accompanied the column stayed on the slopes as pickets and to guard the lines of communication. General Colley had brought no artillery up to the summit and did not order his men to dig in, against the advice of several of his subordinates, (and each company bringing 4 picks and 6 shovels), since he expected that the Boers would retreat when they saw their position on the Nek was untenable. They also brought a Heliograph, which they used to send some signals to the camp. However, the Boers quickly formed a group of storming parties, led by Nicolaas Smit, from an assortment of volunteers from various commandos, totaling at least 450 men to attack the hill.

By daybreak at 4:30, the 92nd Highlanders covered a wide perimeter of the summit, and a handful occupied Gordon's Knoll on the right side of the summit. Oblivious to the presence of the British troops until the 92nd Gordon Highlanders began to yell and to shake their fists, the Boers began to panic for fear of an artillery attack. Three Boer storming groups of 100–200 men each began a slow advance up the hill, led by Field Cornet Stephanus Roos, Commandant D.J.K. Malan and Commandant Joachim Ferreira. The Boers, the better marksmen, kept their enemy on the slopes at bay while groups crossed the open ground to attack Gordon's Knoll, where, at 12:45, Ferreira's men opened up a tremendous fire on the exposed knoll and captured it. The Boer general Piet Joubert later noted that the British rifles were sighted at 400–600 yards while the battle raged at about 50–100 yards, as the British officers had not told the troops to alter their weapons. Thus they shot downhill over the heads of the exposed Boer attackers.

Colley was in his tent when he was informed of the advancing Boers but took no immediate action until after he had been warned by several subordinates of the seriousness of the attack. Over the next hour, the Boers poured over the top of the British line and engaged the British at long range. Refusing close-combat action, they picked off the British soldiers one by one. The Boers could take advantage of the scrub and high grass that covered the hill, which the British were not trained to do. It was at that stage that British discipline began to break: the troops could not see their opponents and received very little direction from their officers, and they panicked and began to flee.

When more Boers were seen encircling the mountain, the British line collapsed, and many ran pell-mell from the hill. The Gordons held their ground the longest, but once they were broken, the battle was over. The Boers were able to launch an attack, which shattered the-already crumbling British line.

Amid great confusion and increasing slaughter among his men, Colley attempted a fighting retreat, but he was killed by Boer marksmen. The rest of the British force fled down the rear slopes of Majuba, where more were hit by the Boer marksmen firing from the summit. An abortive rearguard action was staged by the 15th Hussars and 60th Rifles, who had marched from a support base at Mount Prospect, but that made little impact on the Boer forces. A total of 285 British were killed, captured or wounded, including Captain Cornwallis Maude, son of government minister Cornwallis Maude, 1st Earl de Montalt.

Several wounded soldiers who soon found themselves surrounded by Boer soldiers gave their accounts later of that day. Many Boers were young farm boys armed with rifles. The revelation that professionally-trained soldiers were defeated by young farmboys led by a smattering of older soldiers proved to be a major blow to Britain's prestige and negotiating position in the treaty that ended the war.

Aftermath
Although small in numbers, the battle is historically significant for four reasons:
 It led to the signing of a peace treaty and later the Pretoria Convention between the British and the reinstated South African Republic that ended the First Boer War.
 The fire and movement ("vuur en beweging" in Afrikaans) tactics employed by the Boers, especially Conmandant Nicolas Smit in his final assault on the hill, were years ahead of their time.
 Coupled with the defeats at Laing's Nek and Schuinshoogte, this third crushing defeat at the hands of the Boers created a fearsome legend in the minds of the British lasting through the Second Boer War, when "Remember Majuba" became a rallying cry.

Some British historians have argued that the defeat marked the beginning of the decline of the British Empire. The First Boer War was the first time since the Revolutionary War that Britain was forced into either acknowledging the independence of a prewar possession or signing a treaty on unfavorable terms that yielded a significant amount of territory. In preceding conflicts, even if they suffered initial defeats, instances of the British not ultimately obtaining a decisive victory were very rare. Since British foreign policy discouraged negotiating from anything other than a position of strength, Majuba was the first time that Britain was defeated in the final engagements of a war. That position neglects that the First Boer War, while arguably Britain's first unambiguous defeat since the American Revolution, was largely unnoticed by the general public. Britain was spared much of the embarrassment of defeat through the original terms ending the war. 

Under the 1881 Pretoria Convention, the British monarch became Head of state in the Transvaal, which was declared a self-governing, not an independent entity, under British suzerainty. Although that was never more than a legal fiction, soon abrogated by the 1884 Pretoria Convention, Britain could still formally deny its defeat. Prior to the discovery of gold in the Transvaal in 1886, it was widely presumed that the Transvaal Republic would not survive economically in the long term anyway. Furthermore, emerging powers, such as the United States, were already acting in open defiance of British hegemony at the time, and there is little evidence Britain's defeat in the brief low-intensity conflict had any significant effect on the foreign relations of the British Empire. The First Anglo-Boer War can at best be called a temporary setback for the British Empire, which would continue to expand for several decades and eventually recover all territory lost in 1881 during the Second Boer War (1899-1902).

Notes

Further reading

Nonfiction
 
Duxbury, G.R. "The Battle of Majuba: 27 February 1881." The South African Military History Society Journal vol 5 no 2. 
Featherstone, Donald. Victorian Colonial Warfare – Africa (London: Blandford, 1992)
 Laband, John. The Transvaal Rebellion: The First Boer War, 1880–1881 (Routledge, 2014).
 Laband, John. The Battle of Majuba Hill: The Transvaal Campaign, 1880–1881 (Helion and Company, 2018).
Meredith, Martin. Diamonds Gold and War, (New York: Public Affairs, 2007):162
 Morris, Jan Heaven's Command, (London: Faber and Faber,1998) pp 442–445.
Tylden, G. "A STUDY IN ATTACK: MAJUBA, 27th FEBRUARY, 1881." Journal of the Society for Army Historical Research 39, no. 157 (1961): 27–36. http://www.jstor.org/stable/44228963.
Ward, S. G. P. "MAJUBA, 1881: The Diary of Colonel W. D. Bond, 58th Regiment." Journal of the Society for Army Historical Research 53, no. 214 (1975): 87–97. http://www.jstor.org/stable/44223086.

Novels
 John Wilcox, Last Stand at Majuba Hill, Headline, 2010, 

Majuba Hill
Majuba Hill
1881 in South Africa
History of KwaZulu-Natal
February 1881 events